Gints Bērziņš (born 8 March 2002) is a Latvian luger who competes internationally.

He represented his country at the 2022 Winter Olympics.

References

External links
 
 
 
 

Latvian male lugers
2002 births
Living people
People from Sigulda
Lugers at the 2022 Winter Olympics
Olympic lugers of Latvia
Lugers at the 2020 Winter Youth Olympics
Youth Olympic gold medalists for Latvia